The Jerash Festival for Culture and Arts is an annually-held event held in Jerash, Jordan. It is part of the Jordan Festival, that aims to enrich cultural activities in Jordan. Founded in 1981 by Queen Noor, it features several shows performed by Jordanian, Arab and foreign artists.

Festival
In 2015, the festival hosted 40 different Jordanian artists in Jerash, along with popular Arab singers such as: Najwa Karam, Maya Diab and Wael Kfouri. The festival is hailed as one of the largest cultural activities in the region with millions of people going to see it.
The 31st Jerash Festival for Culture and Arts in 2016 attracted over 100,000 visitors and the attendance rates were greater than that of the year prior.

References

Festivals in Jordan
1981 establishments in Jordan
Summer events in Jordan